David Harry Crossan (June 8, 1940 – November 6, 2019) was an American football center who played in the National Football League for the Washington Redskins.  He played college football at the University of Maryland and was drafted in the third round of the 1963 NFL Draft by the Philadelphia Eagles.  Crossan was also selected in the sixteenth round of the 1963 AFL Draft by the Denver Broncos.

Crossan attended Collingswood High School in Collingswood, New Jersey.

References

1940 births
2019 deaths
Collingswood High School alumni
Sportspeople from Camden County, New Jersey
American football centers
Maryland Terrapins football players
Washington Redskins players
Players of American football from New Jersey
Players of American football from Philadelphia